Leroy Maxey Drumm (September 26, 1936 – November 26, 2010) was an American bluegrass/country music songwriter who served in the United States Navy, in the 3rd Division as a sonar man aboard the  (DD-707), an Allen M. Sumner-class destroyer and deployed to the Mediterranean from July 1956 to February 1957.

Upon leaving the Navy he worked as a general laborer and welder in and around Detroit, Michigan. Leroy and Pete Goble co-wrote the song "Colleen Malone" recorded by Hot Rize on their Take It Home, that won the IBMA's Song of the Year award in 1991.

Career
The Algonac, Michigan-born Drumm was a songwriter that some in the bluegrass world only knew by name in the shadows of others.

List of recorded songs
Larry Sparks:
Blue Virginia Blues  
Natural Thing To Do  
Halfway To Tulsa  
Getting Over You  
Slow Train  
Tennessee 1949  
Gunfighter's Revenge  
I'd Like To Be A Train  
Little Ways Down The Road

Doyle Lawson & Quicksilver:
God Sent An Angel
Georgia Girl
Julianne
Poet With Wings
She's Walking Through My Memory
Russell Moore and IIIrd Tyme Out:
Candle In The Wind
Count Every Teardrop I Cry
Silence And Pain
Woman Dressed In Scarlet 
Moundsville Pen 
Phone Call Away

Charlie Waller and The Country Gentlemen:
Delta Queen 
Willow Creek Dam 
Billy McGee The Drummer Boy 
Back To Being Me 
This Land Must Die
Free As The Wind 
Circuit Rider 
Joe's Last Train

Bluegrass Cardinals:
Apple Trees And Honey Bees 
Jubilee Road
Morristown

Bill Emerson:
Last Night I Was There
Days When You Were Mine
My Heart Barely Keeps Me Alive AKA (This Heart You Have Broken)
Today I Turned Your Picture To The Wall

The Spinney Brothers
The Whole World Must Be Knowin' (How Much I'm Missing You)
Thank God For the Highways

Various Other Artists:
Leaving You And Mobile Too 
You Can Keep Your Nine Pound Hammer 
Colleen Malone 
Fiddler's Green 
I Can Make Him Whisper (I Love You) 
Lovin' Aint Been Easy On My Mind 
Born To Be A Drifter
Back To Hancock County
Dixie In My Eye 
Another Boy That Sings Like Hank 
Day We Learn To Fly
Sweet Mary Of The Mountains 
Blue Mandolin 
I'm Ready To Go 
Walking The Blues 
Sally And The Gambler 
Bad Day In Akron 
How Strong Do My Walls Have To Be 
Restless Blue Eyed Lover 
Many Hills of Time 
Back To Dixie 
Walking In The Early Morning Dew 
Back To Sugarhill 
Old Man And The Kid

Drumm began writing in 1952. In 1961 he was introduced to Pete Goble in a bar one night. Leroy showed Pete the lyrics he had been writing and Pete said they didn't make any sense. In Leroy's own words, Pete said "They was garbage, and a waste of his time to even look at them". Leroy was disgusted with these sort of comments, and he gave all the lyrics he had in a folder (about 200–250) "to a guy in the bar that night". He said "By doing this, I guess it was to assure myself that I'd no longer try to do something that I'd had no success at." In 1971, Pete reached out to Leroy to come co-write with him on songs. He had a successful run at writing some top songs in the 10 years since 1961 to include "Big Spike Hammer" with Bobby Osborne. Once Leroy and Pete started writing it all became a reality for Leroy, and since then his songs have been recorded by various notable artists. In 1974, Drumm had four songs recorded on the Country Gentlemen's album Remembrances & Forecasts, "Willow Creek Dam", "Delta Queen" about the actual river boat the Delta Queen, "Billy McGee The Drummer Boy", and "Circuit Rider". In 1976 he was honored to have the Country Gentlemen use his song "Joe's Last Train" as the title track of their next album and the song "This Land Must Die" was on that same album.

In 2006 The Complete Vanguard Recordings was released and the four tracks of Leroy's were used from Remembrances & Forecasts.

One of his last projects with Stacy Richardson was a favor for a World War II veteran named Private James W. Bozeman who went to church with Stacy. Leroy was asked to write a song about the Battle of the Bulge and the account from a combat medics point of view in the 94th Infantry Division. His lyrics composed with Stacy's melody was posted on the 94th Infantry Division's website as a tribute to American heroes who fought and died in World War II.

Death
Leroy Drumm died due to complications of respiratory and heart failure at his home in Waynesboro, Tennessee, on 26 November 2010,

Legacy
Bob Mitchell of Radio Bluegrass International and WKWC-FM Owensboro, Kentucky did a one-hour tribute to songwriters Leroy Drumm and Pete Goble. The international segment features bands from Australia, the Czech Republic, Sweden, and Italy. It was recorded on January 15, 2011, at WFPK-FM 91.9, Louisville KY.

In 2014,the title track of the album "The Day We Learn to Fly" that was written by Leroy and Stacy Richardson and recorded by the band Volume Five was nominated at the 25th Annual IBMA Awards for "Gospel Recorded Performance Of The Year.

Leroy and his son Roger started a publishing company called "Sound of Drumm's Music"  in late 2008, 2 years before Leroy's death, in which Leroy wanted Roger to carry his legacy on and publish many of his 700 other works of lyrics yet to be recorded. Roger has since teamed up with a select few of the best in the business of Bluegrass Music to finish these works to create music for the fans of Leroy's music to enjoy for years to come. Once his entire repertoire is completed, he will have over 1000 songs in his song catalog.

Awards

References

1936 births
2010 deaths
Songwriters from Michigan
American bluegrass musicians
People from Algonac, Michigan
People from Waynesboro, Tennessee
Country musicians from Tennessee
Country musicians from Michigan